III Corps was a corps of the German Army (Bundeswehr Heer) active from 1957 to 1994.

The preparation of the staff of the corps took place from 16 March 1957 at Gneisenau-Kaserne, Koblenz; the corps was officially formed on 6 April 1957. Initially, the 2nd Panzergrenadier Division and 5th Panzer Division moved in 1957 from the II Corps to III Corps. The corps was integrated into defence planning from mid-1957, as part of NATO's Central Army Group, commanded by the commander of the U.S. Seventh Army. The area of operations was the FRG-DDR and German-Czechoslovak border in Hesse and Franconia. On 1 December 1958 the 7th Panzer Division was transferred from the III Corps to the I Corps. Among the first corps troops were Ordnance regiment 504 (formed May 16, 1957 in Diez, transferred January 1958 in Koblenz), and Corps Artillery Command 403 (based until 1 July 1957 at Munsterlager, from August 1957 in Koblenz). Under corps command were a rocket artillery battalion, a supply battalion, and a geophysical measurement train.

Smilo Freiherr von Lüttwitz was the first commander of the corps, as a Lieutenant General.

Initially from 1959 the corps' troops under Heeresstruktur II consisted of :
2nd Panzergrenadier Division (Marburg)
Panzergrenadierbrigade 4 (Göttingen)
Panzergrenadierbrigade 5 (Kassel)
Panzerbrigade 6 (Marburg)
5th Panzer Division (Koblenz)
Panzergrenadierbrigade 13 (Wetzlar)
Panzerbrigade 14 (Koblenz)
Panzerbrigade 15 (Koblenz)
7th Panzergrenadier (later Panzer) Division (Unna)
Panzergrenadierbrigade 19 (Ahlen)
Panzerbrigade 21 (Augustdorf)
Corps Troops

Under Heeresstruktur III from 1970 the 2nd Division was converted into a Jäger or light infantry formation. Creating more Jager troops was intended to provide smaller, more mobile and yet strong anti-tank formations that would be able to fight in the unfavourable terrain of the German low mountain ranges even during a nuclear war. As a "compensation" for the lost tank units, a tank regiment was initially planned as a tactical reserve as corps troops. In contrast to the corresponding tank regiments of the other two corps, however, the formation of this regiment was never ordered. However, the corps was assigned an airborne brigade of the 1st Airborne Division (Bundeswehr) as a reserve. In addition, at the level of the corps troops, the previous army aviation battalion was reorganized into a light and a medium army aviation transport regiment. According to the nomenclature of the other corps commands, the corps artillery command 403 was renamed Artilleriekommando 3 in 1972, and the medical command 253 was renamed Medical Command 3. In January 1977 all three divisions of the III. Corps grew to the three subordinate brigades that had been targeted since the founding of the Bundeswehr. Since 1981 these brigades were then named according to the usual numbering.

In 1994 the corps headquarters was disbanded and re-designated the headquarters of the German Army Forces Command.

At the end of the Cold War in 1989, the corps commanded the 2nd Panzergrenadier, 5th Panzer, and 12th Panzer Divisions.

Commanding Generals

References

 O. W. Dragoner, Die Bundeswehr 1989, Vol. 2.1, available here

Further reading 
 Soldat im III. Korps. Bilddokumente eines Großverbandes des Heeres. Herausgeber III. Korps, Redaktion Peter Bolte. - Koblenz: Rhenania Fachverlag 1982.
 175 Jahre Korpskommando Koblenz. Herausgegeben vom Korpskommando III. Korps, verantwortlich: Oberstleutnant Armin Meyer-Detring. - Koblenz [1990].

Army corps of the Bundeswehr
Military units and formations established in 1957
Military units and formations disestablished in 1994